Dakota Morton (born June 12, 1988, in Canada) is known as the World's Youngest Radio Host. He created the record and set it on January 16, 1999 at the age of 10 years, 218 days. The record was awarded while Dakota was hosting his radio show at CJAV radio in Port Alberni.

Dakota is now a professional film editor and received a 2022 Leo Award "Best Picture Editing Feature Length Documentary" for the documentary Precious Leader Woman.

See also
List of radio stations in British Columbia

References

Canadian radio personalities
1988 births
Living people
Place of birth missing (living people)